Worship is an honorific prefix for mayors, justices of the peace, peace commissioners, and magistrates in present or former Commonwealth realms. In spoken address, these officials are addressed as Your Worship or referred to as His Worship, Her Worship, or Their Worship. In Australia, all states now use Your Honour as the form of address for magistrates (the same as has always been used for judges in higher courts).

Etymology 
The term worship implies that citizens give or attribute special worth or esteem (worthship) to their first-citizen or mayor.

The Right Worshipful

The Right Worshipful (The Rt Wpful., Rt. W or RW) is an honorific style of address for all lord mayors and mayors of specific cities including the original Cinque Ports (Sandwich, Hythe, Dover, Romney and Hastings). Some historic boroughs, such as Shrewsbury and Atcham in Shropshire, also address their mayors by this prefix. In India, the mayors of cities such as Bengaluru, Mysore and Chennai are addressed as Worshipful Mayor with robes and attire as for the Lord Mayor of the City of London. The style was done away with by the Government of Kerala and the mayors in Kerala are now referred to as Respected Mayor.

The style is also traditionally used for the Vice-Chancellor of the University of Cambridge. In Australia, the lord mayors of Darwin, Northern Territory; Parramatta, New South Wales; Newcastle, New South Wales; and Wollongong, New South Wales are also styled thus.

The Worshipful 
The Worshipful is an honorific style of address for all Chancellors of Dioceses. A Chancellor's role as a judge, presiding over any consistory or ecclesiastical court, determines that the individual should be styled in this manner.

Worshipful Master 

In Freemasonry, Worshipful Master is the traditional style of address for the chairman of a lodge.

See also 
 Style (manner of address) 
 Excellency
 The Honourable
 The Right Honourable
 Forms of address in the United Kingdom
 Livery company (Worshipful Company of...)

References 

British culture
Styles (forms of address)
Titles